Auvergne is a region in France. 

Named after it are: 
 Auvergne horse
 Bleu d'Auvergne, a cheese originating in Auvergne
 Régiment d'Auvergne, a former regiment of the French Army from the province of Auvergne
 Rural Municipality of Auvergne No. 76, Saskatchewan, Canada
 Auvergne Station, a cattle station in the Northern Territory of Australia